This is a list  of articles about academic journals in environmental social science.

A 
 Antipode
 Area

C 
 Case Studies in the Environment
 Children, Youth and Environments
 Conservation and Society
 Cultural Geographies

D 
 Disasters

E 
 Ecological Economics
 Ecology and Society
 Energy & Environment
 Energy Policy
 Energy Research & Social Science]
 Environment and Behavior Environment and Planning Environment and Urbanization Environmental and Resource Economics Environmental Health Perspectives Environmental Research Letters Environmental Science & Technology Environmental Sociology Environmental Values G 
 Geoforum Global Environmental Change Global Environmental Politics H 
 Hastings West-Northwest Journal of Environmental Law and Policy Human Ecology I 
 Indoor and Built Environment International Journal of Ecology & Development International Regional Science Review J 
 The Journal of Environment & Development Journal of Environmental Assessment Policy and Management Journal of Environmental Economics and Management [https://www.springer.com/environment/journal/13412 Journal of Environmental Studies and Sciences
 Journal of Environmental Psychology
 Journal of Political Ecology

L 
 Land Economics

N 
 Natural Resources Forum
 Nature and Culture

O 
 Organization & Environment

P 
 Papers in Regional Science
 Population and Environment
 Progress in Human Geography

R  
 Review of Environmental Economics and Policy

S 
 Society & Natural Resources

W 
 Water Resources Research

See also 
 List of environmental economics journals
 List of environmental journals
 List of environmental periodicals
 List of forestry journals
 List of planning journals
 Lists of academic journals

External links 
 Environment and Society: Scholarly Journals

 
Environmental social science
Journals
Environmental social science journals
Social science journals